Twin Lakes Airport  is a privately owned, public-use airport located five miles (8 km) northeast of the central business district of Mocksville, in Davie County, North Carolina, United States.

Facilities and aircraft 
For the 12-month period ending August 10, 2007, the airport had 30,000 aircraft operations, an average of 82 per day: 97% general aviation and 3% military. At that time there were 92 aircraft based at this airport: 88% single-engine, 10% multi-engine, 1% helicopter and 1% glider.

References

External links 
 

Airports in North Carolina
Transportation in Davie County, North Carolina
Buildings and structures in Davie County, North Carolina